The Hanshin Stakes is a Listed American Thoroughbred horse race held annually in July at Churchill Downs. The event open to horses three years of age and older, it is contested on dirt over a distance of 8 furlongs and currently offers a purse of $100,000.

History
The race was inaugurated in 1941 at Arlington Park as the Equipoise Mile in honor of the great colt Equipoise. It was raced under that name from 1941 through 1963 and in 1966 and 1967. In 1964 and 1965 it was raced as the Equipoise Handicap then from 1968 through 1997.

The race was hosted by the Washington Park Race Track from 1943 through 1945. It was run in two divisions in 1945.

The race was not run from 1970 through 1978 and in 1988. It was on hiatus again in 1998 and 1999 but returned as the Hanshin Cup Handicap in 2000. 

U.S. Racing Hall of Fame inductee Swoon's Son won back-to-back runnings of this race in 1957-58. In 1967, the race saw the last racecourse appearance of the 1965 United States Horse of the Year Moccasin.

Due to the unpredictability of the race, it has been said many times on Hanshin Cup Day, “Anything can happen in the Hanshin”.

Past winners
 2022 - Cody's Wish
 2021 - Guest Suite (Emmanuel Esquivel)
 2020 - Not Held
 2019 - Lanier (Declan Cannon)
 2018 - Matrooh (Santo Sanjur)
 2017 - Crewman (Carlos Marquez, Jr.)
 2016 - Trace Creek (Julio E. Felix)
 2015 - Midnight Cello (Florent Geroux)
 2014 - Nikki's Sandcastle (Leandro R. Goncalves)
 2013 - Hogy (Christopher A. Emigh)
 2012 - Havelock (Florent Geroux)
 2011 - Workin for Hops (James Graham)
 2010 - Country Flavor (Inez Karlsson)
 2009 - Vacation (John Velazquez)
 2008 - Coragil Cat (Diego Sanchez)
 2007 - Spotsgone (Earlie Fires)
 2006 - Gouldings Green (Corey Lanerie)
 2005 - Lord of the Game (Eusebio Razo, Jr.)
 2004 - Crafty Shaw (Craig Perret)
 2003 - Apt to Be (Eusebio Razo, Jr.)
 2002 - Bonapaw (Gerard Melancon)
 2001 - Bright Valour (Robby Albarado)
 2000 - Bright Valour (Jesse Campbell)
 1999 - No Race
 1998 - No race
 
 1997 - Announce
 1996 - Golden Gear
 1995 - Tarzan's Blase
 1994 - Slerp
 1993 - Split Run
 1992 - Katahaula County
 1967 - Renewed Vigor (Martinez Heath)

References
 The Hanshin Cup Handicap at the NTRA

Horse races in Kentucky
Open mile category horse races
Recurring sporting events established in 1941
Arlington Park
1941 establishments in Illinois
Churchill Downs